is a Japanese professional footballer who plays as a winger for Bundesliga club SC Freiburg and the Japan national team.

Club career

Gamba Osaka 
Coming through the youth system, Dōan joined J1 League club Gamba Osaka in 2015. On 27 May, he debuted against FC Seoul in the 2015 AFC Champions League. In 2016, he mainly played for their Gamba Osaka's newly-established reserve team Gamba Osaka U-23 in the J3 League.

Groningen 
In June 2017, Dōan moved to Eredivisie club FC Groningen on loan with an option to purchase on a three-year contract. The option was exercised on 23 April 2018, and Dōan transferred to Groningen on a permanent basis on 1 July 2018.

On 15 April 2018, against Roda, Dōan scored his eighth goal of the season, equaling the total of goals Arjen Robben scored as a teenager for Groningen.

PSV Eindhoven
Dōan joined PSV Eindhoven on a five-year contract in 2019.

Loan to Arminia Bielefeld
In September 2020, he moved on loan to Bundesliga side Arminia Bielefeld for the 2020–21 season. Dōan made his debut in the opening game of the season, a 1–1 draw against Eintracht Frankfurt. Dōan scored his first goal for Bielefeld in a 4–1 home defeat against Bayern Munich.

SC Freiburg
On 5 July 2022, SC Freiburg announced that they had signed Dōan ahead of the 2022–23 season.

International career

Youth
In May 2017, Dōan was elected Japan national under-20 team for the 2017 U-20 World Cup. At this tournament, he played full-time in all four matches and scored three goals.

Senior
On 30 August 2018, Dōan received his first international call-up from the Japan national team for the Kirin Challenge Cup 2018. He started his debut appearance in a friendly match against Costa Rica on 11 September 2018, and scored his debut goal in a friendly match against Uruguay on 16 October 2018.

He was called-up by Hajime Moriyasu to represent Japan in the 2022 FIFA World Cup. He featured in Japan's first match of the competition against Germany on 23 November 2022, being subbed on in the second half while Japan was 1–0 down. Dōan scored the equalizer four minutes after coming on as his side later went on to win the game 2–1. In an almost identical turn of events, he was subbed on in the second half of Japan's final group stage match against Spain on 1 December 2022 while Japan was 1–0 down, and scored the equalizer two minutes after coming on as his side later went on to win 2–1. The win ultimately qualified Japan for the tournament's knockout stages as group winners.

Career statistics

Club

International

Scores and results list Japan's goal tally first, score column indicates score after each Dōan goal.

Honours
PSV
 KNVB Cup: 2021–22

Japan U-19
 AFC U-19 Championship: 2016

Japan
 AFC Asian Cup runner-up: 2019

Individual
 Asian Young Footballer of the Year: 2016
 AFC U-19 Championship MVP: 2016
 Japan Pro-Footballers Association awards: Best XI (2022)

References

External links
 
 
 
 
 

Living people
1998 births
Association football midfielders
Association football people from Hyōgo Prefecture
Japanese footballers
Japan international footballers
Japan youth international footballers
J1 League players
J3 League players
Eredivisie players
Bundesliga players
Gamba Osaka players
Gamba Osaka U-23 players
FC Groningen players
PSV Eindhoven players
Arminia Bielefeld players
SC Freiburg players
2019 AFC Asian Cup players
2022 FIFA World Cup players
Japanese expatriate footballers
Expatriate footballers in the Netherlands
Expatriate footballers in Germany
Japanese expatriate sportspeople in the Netherlands
Footballers at the 2020 Summer Olympics
Olympic footballers of Japan
Sportspeople from Amagasaki